Jam Abdul Karim Bijar is a Pakistani politician who has been a member of the National Assembly of Pakistan since August 2018.

Political career
He was elected to the National Assembly of Pakistan from Constituency NA-236 (Malir-I) as a candidate of Pakistan Peoples Party in 2018 Pakistani general election.

Murder
He and his brother Jam Awais Bijar Khan Jokhio tortured and murdered a local journalist Nazim Jokhio on 3 November 2021. Reportedly, the 27-year-old victim tried to stop the guests of Jokhio from hunting the Houbara bustard bird in Thatta. FIR was registered against Bijar and he was taken into police custody.

References

Living people
Jamote people
Pakistani MNAs 2018–2023
Pakistan People's Party politicians
Year of birth missing (living people)
Pakistani murderers